Herbert Friedman (June 21, 1916 – September 9, 2000) was an American physicist and astronomer who did research in X-ray astronomy. During his career Friedman published hundreds of scientific papers. One such example is "Ultraviolet and X Rays from the Sun". He was elected to the American Academy of Arts and Sciences and the United States National Academy of Sciences in 1960. He received the Eddington Medal of the Royal Astronomical Society in 1964. That same year, he was elected to the American Philosophical Society.

See also

References

External links
Oral history interview transcript for Herbert Friedman on 21 August 1980, American Institute of Physics, Niels Bohr Library & Archives
Oral history interview transcript for Herbert Friedman on 7 June 1983, American Institute of Physics, Niels Bohr Library & Archives
Oral history interview transcript for Herbert Friedman, Talbot Chubb, E. T. Byram and Robert Kreplin on 12 December 1986, American Institute of Physics, Niels Bohr Library & Archives
NY Times death announcement
Washington Post obituary

21st-century American astronomers
1916 births
2000 deaths
Place of birth missing
Members of the American Philosophical Society
Fellows of the American Physical Society